Little Point is an unincorporated community in Adams Township, Morgan County, in the U.S. state of Indiana.

History
A post office was established at Little Point in 1876, and remained in operation until it was discontinued in 1908.

Geography

References

Unincorporated communities in Morgan County, Indiana
Unincorporated communities in Indiana
Indianapolis metropolitan area